The 1997 Colorado Buffaloes football team represented the University of Colorado at Boulder during the 1997 NCAA Division I-A football season. The team played their home games at Folsom Field in Boulder, Colorado. They participated in the Big 12 Conference in the North Division. They were coached by head coach Rick Neuheisel.

For the second time in the decade, Colorado played the nation's toughest schedule. While all five wins were forfeited due to the use of an ineligible player, the NCAA and Colorado recognize all the results on the field for its records. Therefore, Colorado's official 1997 record is 0–11.

Schedule

References

Colorado
Colorado Buffaloes football seasons
Colorado Buffaloes football